Pleterje is a village west of Lovrenc na Dravskem Polju in the Municipality of Kidričevo in northeastern Slovenia. The area is part of the traditional region of Styria. It is now included with the rest of the municipality in the Drava Statistical Region.

History
The settlement of Pleterje was created in 1952, when the formerly separate villages of Spodnje Pleterje and Zgornje Pleterje were merged into a single settlement.

References

External links
Pleterje on Geopedia

Populated places in the Municipality of Kidričevo